Series 17 of Top Gear, a British motoring magazine and factual television programme, was broadcast in the United Kingdom on BBC Two during 2011, consisting of six episodes that were aired between 26 June and 31 July. This series' highlights included the presenters making their own trains with cars and caravans, and using second-hand military vehicles to demolish houses. The seventeenth series faced criticism over its review of electric cars by attempting to mislead viewers.

Episodes

Criticism

The seventeenth series faced criticism following the broadcast of its final episode, over two elements in their Electric Cars review film. The first complaint focused on criticism of the presenters Jeremy Clarkson and James May for parking their cars into two disabled parking spaces. Executive producer Andy Wilman defended the presenters in an online blog on this matter, revealing that both had expressed deep concerns it would create a disrespectful impression, but only used the spaces when the car park's owner gave permission, adding that there had been three other disabled parking spaces available, before apologising to any viewers that had been upset by the scene.

The second complaint was made by several parties, including Nissan, electric car enthusiasts and newspapers when it transpired that a Nissan Leaf that had run out of charge, and required pushing in a scene in the film, had been run down to around 40% of its capacity before the car's test drive, leading to criticism on the programme's view on electric cars. Wilman rejected claims that the show was misleading viewers about the Leaf's charge and range, and stood by the consumer points that were raised in the film.

Notes
The viewing figures shown in the Episode Table above, are a combination of the figures from the BBC Two broadcast and the BBC HD broadcast.

References 

2011 British television seasons
Top Gear seasons